Black Science is the second studio album by heavy metal band GZR (known at the time as Geezer). It was released on July 1, 1997 by TVT Records. The cover art for the album is intended to represent the Black Sabbath song "Hand of Doom".

Geezer about the Doctor Who connection in the song "Among the Cybermen":
"Yes, the lyrics were originally about the death of Doctor Who. The original chorus was "Doctor Who lies dead among the Cybermen", about the final battle of Dr. Who, but was supposed to be symbolic of the end of childhood. I changed it because I thought it sounded a bit silly. Most of the album is about growing up in the era of Sixties television, and its influence on me."

Track listing 
 "Man in a Suitcase"  – 4:09
 "Box of Six"  – 3:53
 "Mysterons"  – 5:36
 "Justified"  – 4:05
 "Department S"  – 4:45
 "Area Code 51"  – 4:48
 "Has to Be"  – 3:29
 "Number 5"  – 5:04
 "Among the Cybermen"  – 4:43
 "Unspeakable Elvis"  – 3:47
 "Xodiak"  – 3:34
 "Northern Wisdom"  – 3:46
 "Trinity Road"  – 3:26
 "Beach Skeleton"  – 3:28 (Japan pressing only; later released online for free on March 3, 2010)

Credits 
 Geezer Butler – bass guitar, keyboards
 Pedro Howse – guitar
 Clark Brown – vocals
 Deen Castronovo – drums
 Recorded at Studio Morin Heights
 Produced by Geezer Butler & Paul Northfield
 Assisted by Simon Pressey
 Mixed by Paul Northfield at Studio Morin Heights
 Assisted by Don Hachey
 All music and lyrics written by Butler/Howse/Brown

References

External links 
Black Science at Geezer Butler's Website
Black Science at Black Sabbath Online

1997 albums
GZR albums
TVT Records albums
Albums produced by Paul Northfield